John Elphinstone (1722–1785),  was a British naval officer.

John Elphinstone may also refer to:

John Elphinstone, 13th Lord Elphinstone (1807–1860), Scottish soldier, politician and colonial administrator
John Elphinstone, 2nd Lord Balmerino (died 1649), Scottish aristocrat
John Elphinstone, 17th Lord Elphinstone (1914–1975), British nobleman
John Elphinstone (courtier) (1553–1614), Scottish courtier
Sir John Elphinstone, 2nd Baronet (1675–1732), of the Elphinstone baronets
Sir John Elphinstone, 4th Baronet (c. 1717–1743), of the Elphinstone baronets
Sir John Elphinstone, de jure 5th Baronet (1665–1758), of the Elphinstone baronets
Sir John Elphinstone, de jure 7th Baronet (1771–1835), of the Elphinstone baronets
Sir John Elphinstone, de jure 9th Baronet (1834–1893), of the Elphinstone baronets
Sir John Elphinstone, 11th Baronet (born 1924), of the Elphinstone baronets
Sir John Howard Main Elphinstone, 6th Baronet (born 1949), of the Elphinstone baronets